Warwick Mountain is a mountain in Alberta, Canada.

It is located south of Warwick Creek in the Athabasca River Valley of Jasper National Park. It stands east of the Chaba Icefield and north of the Columbia Icefield.

References

Two-thousanders of Alberta
Mountains of Jasper National Park